Gorenja Bukova Gora is a remote abandoned settlement in the Municipality of Kočevje in southern Slovenia. The area is part of the traditional region of Lower Carniola and is now included in the Southeast Slovenia Statistical Region. Its territory is now part of the village of Bukova Gora.

History
Gorenja Bukova Gora was a Gottschee German village. It was abandoned in the late 19th and early 20th century, when all its inhabitants emigrated, mostly to the United States. A cabin for forestry workers was later built in the vicinity of the village. Together with Srednja Bukova Gora and Spodnja Bukova Gora, it was merged into the settlement of Bukova Gora in 1955.

References

External links
Gorenja Bukova Gora (unlabeled) on Geopedia
Pre–World War II list of oeconyms and family names in Gorenja Bukova Gora

Former populated places in the Municipality of Kočevje
1955 disestablishments in Slovenia